Kyiv Archive Museum of Transitional Period was a propaganda museum whose establishment was sanctioned by German occupants on March 26, 1942.

The museum existed from April - October 1942. Its expositions demonstrated "achievements" of the German occupation and crimes of Joseph Stalin's regime. The museum's director was the famous Ukrainian historian Oleksander Ohloblyn who used this opportunity to organize an exhibition about cultural monuments destroyed by Bolsheviks. Several historians, such as Oleksandr Hruzynsky, Svitozar Drahomanov, Natalia Polonska-Vasylenko etc. were as appointed scientific advisors of the museum. Some of the city archive fonds were transferred to the museum.

However, the propaganda effect of the museum was very low (about 20 visitors daily) and the museum was soon closed.

References

Literature 
 Part 2: From Bolshevism to the New Order: Museum-Archive of the Transitional Period in Kiev, 1942.
 Музей-Архів Переходової доби. К. 2002 (in Ukrainian)

History of Kyiv
Museums in Kyiv
History museums in Ukraine
Museums established in 1942
Kiev Archive Museum
Defunct museums in Ukraine
1942 establishments in the Soviet Union